The 2020 season was Sandefjord's first season back in the Eliteserien following their relegation to the 1. divisjon at the end of the 2018 season.

Season events
On 12 June, the Norwegian Football Federation announced that a maximum of 200 home fans would be allowed to attend the upcoming seasons matches.

On 10 September, the Norwegian Football Federation cancelled the 2020 Norwegian Cup due to the COVID-19 pandemic in Norway.

On 30 September, the Minister of Culture and Gender Equality, Abid Raja, announced that clubs would be able to have crowds of 600 at games from 12 October.

On 28 November, Sandefjord's match against Odd on 29 November was postponed due to a positive COVID-19 case within the Odd squad and the whole squad having to quarantine.

Squad

Out on loan

Transfers

In

Out

Released

Friendlies

Competitions

Eliteserien

Results summary

Results by round

Results

Table

Norwegian Cup

Squad statistics

Appearances and goals

|-
|colspan="14"|Players away from Sandefjord on loan:
|-
|colspan="14"|''Players who left Sandefjord during the season
|}

Goal scorers

Clean sheets

Disciplinary record

References

Sandefjord Fotball seasons
Sandefjord